Ferrymead is a suburb of Christchurch, New Zealand.

Ferrymead may also refer to:
Ferrymead Railway, a heritage railway
Ferrymead Bays, a soccer club in Christchurch, New Zealand

See also
Ferrymead Two Foot Railway
Ferrymead Heritage Park, a museum in Christchurch, New Zealand